Our Sons is a 1991 American made-for-television drama film starring Julie Andrews and Ann-Margret as two mothers of gay sons, one of whom is dying of AIDS. It was inspired by Micki Dickoff's 1987 documentary, Too Little, Too Late, about three families who had supported children with AIDS which had won an Emmy Award.

As it was a TV movie, ”It’s much safer to take the route of dealing with the two mothers” as the protagonists, said director John Erman.

It was broadcast the same day as GMHC's annual AIDS Walk in New York.

Plot
With his partner Donald dying of AIDS, James asks his mother Audrey, a businesswoman in San Diego, to travel to Fayetteville, Arkansas and notify Donald's estranged mother, Luanne. A small town waitress, Luanne must overcome her own overt homophobia and learn to love her son unconditionally. In the process, Luanne cements a lasting friendship with Audrey, who is struggling with her own internalized homophobia.

Cast
 Ann-Margret as Luanne Barnes
 Julie Andrews as Audrey Grant
 Hugh Grant as James Grant
 Željko Ivanek as Donald Barnes
 Tony Roberts as Harry
 Hal England as Charley
 Loyda Ramos as Patient's Wife
 Annabelle Weenick as Nurse
 Lisa Blake Richards as Female Bar Patron
 Essex Smith as Trailer Park Manager
 Frank Whiteman as George
 Elizabeth Austin as Sally

Reception
Ken Tucker of Entertainment Weekly magazine stated "Our Sons means well, and performances are above reproach. But it’s also an infuriating piece of work that insults the intelligence of everyone invoked, especially its audience". He gave the movie a score of D.

"While the movie is too talky and not poignant enough to be great television, it rates high for integrity" is the opinion of David Hiltbrand of People. He also said that Julie Andrews brings "enormous dignity and clarity to her role".

Co-producer Micki Dickoff later stated "a father in Philadelphia was so moved by the television movie, he reconciled with his AIDS-stricken child".

References

External links
 

1991 television films
1991 films
1991 drama films
American LGBT-related television films
Films directed by John Erman
HIV/AIDS in American films
ABC Motion Pictures films
HIV/AIDS in television
1991 LGBT-related films
Films scored by John Morris
1990s American films